Cool it Carol! is a 1970 British sex comedy-drama film directed and produced by Pete Walker, starring Robin Askwith and Janet Lynn. It was released in the US as Dirtiest Girl I Ever Met.

Plot
The cautionary tale of Joe and Carol, a couple of youngsters who leave the "sticks" behind and journey to Swinging London in search of fame and fortune. Joe fails to find employment in the big city, but Carol enrols as a fashion model. As the naïve couple begin to enjoy the night life of London they are drawn ever deeper into a world of pornography, drugs and prostitution.

Cast
 Robin Askwith - Joe Sickles
 Janet Lynn - Carol Thatcher
 Jess Conrad - Jonathan
 Stubby Kaye - Rod Strangeways
 Derek Aylward - Tommy Sanders
 Kenneth Hendel - Pimp
 Stephen Bradley - Terry
 Harry Baird - Benny Gray
 Chris Sandford - David Thing
 Peter Elliott - Philip Stanton
 Claire Gordon - Samantha
 Pete Murray - (credited as Peter Murray) Himself
 Eric Barker - Signalman
 Pearl Hackney - Mother
 Martin Wyldeck - Father

Production
According to the opening credits, "this story is true but actual names and places are fictitious"; the film being apparently inspired by a tabloid article the director read in the News of the World.

Filming locations
The film was shot on location in the villages of Northiam and Bodiam, Sussex and London, England.

Music
The music was composed and conducted by Cyril Ornadel.

Release

Critical response
'DVD Drive-in' wrote, "it’s no great film by any means, but it’s an enjoyable time capsule romp worth checking out."
'lightsfade.co.uk' wrote, "if you're a fan of late 60's nostalgia then there's a lot of prime material here. The world of "Cool it Carol" returns us to an era when petrol stations looked both picturesque and romantic, trains looked clean and ran on time, antique red buses were in abundance alongside phlegmatic cab drivers (some things never change)...With chunks of wonderfully cheesy dialogue, "Cool it Carol" is a kitsch delight."
'moviesaboutgirls.com' called the film "glum, gray, and depressive."
'Cinedelica' wrote, "compared to a movie like Smashing Time, Cool It Carol! is probably the more realistic portrayal of the swinging London dream. But we're still in the land of the exploitation flick, so don't expect Ken Loach-like realism."
Pablo Kjolseth writes in 'TCM.com', "in reflecting on scenes that stood out as memorable, my vote goes for the disturbing and eerie tight shots (seen more than once) of old men licking their dry lips with lusty tongues at the sight of nude, young women. These brief moments introduce an ominous, unpredictable, claustrophobic and icky energy into an otherwise languid story. An early indication, perhaps, that Walker's talents would be best served in a different genre."

Home media

External links

References

1970 films
1970 comedy-drama films
1970 independent films
1970s sex comedy films
British comedy-drama films
British independent films
British sex comedy films
1970s English-language films
Films about pornography
Films about prostitution in the United Kingdom
Films directed by Pete Walker
Films set in London
1970s British films